Dea Birkett (born 1958) is a British writer, journalist, broadcaster and a former circus performer.

Personal life

Birkett was brought up in the suburbs of Surrey, England. As a child she watched the circus parade through her town, which made her want to be in a circus. When she had her eldest daughter Storme Toolis in year 1992, she left her daughter with her child’s father Kevin Toolis, so she could run away to the circus. She  left the circus in year 1993 but when Birkett turned 60 years of age, she “ran away” again to return to the Circus life beside her youngest child River Toolis.

Career

Birkett during her time as journalist she had written on social issues for The Guardian and broadcasts for BBC Radio 4. She is creative director of the charity Kids in Museums and Ringmaster of Circus 250. She was awarded the Somerset Maugham Award in 1993 for her book Jella, in which follows Birkett journey from Africa to the UK.

Bibliography
Spinsters Abroad (1989)
Jella: A Woman at Sea (1992)
Mary Kingsley: Imperial Adventuress (1992)
Serpent in Paradise (1997)

References

External links
Official site

British journalists
British writers
Fellows of the Royal Society of Literature
People from Surrey
1958 births
Living people